Night's Black Agents is a collection of fantasy and horror short stories by American writer  Fritz Leiber. It was released in 1947 and was the author's first book. The book's title is taken from Macbeth, Act III, scene ii. It was published  by Arkham House in an edition of 3,084 copies.

Most of the stories originally appeared in the magazines Unknown and Weird Tales.  Three were first published in this book. The last two stories showcase Leiber's Sword and Sorcery heroes Fafhrd and the Gray Mouser. 

Later editions added additional material under the same title. The Berkley (1978) reprint adds two stories "The Girl with the Hungry Eyes" and "A Bit of the Dark World". The definitive version is the Gregg Press (1980) hardcover which adds a Foreword by Richard Gid Powers to the complete contents of the Berkley edition and is thus an expansion of the original Arkham House edition.

Contents

Night's Black Agents contains the following tales:

 "Foreword"
 "Smoke Ghost"
 "The Automatic Pistol"
 "The Inheritance / The Phantom Slayer"
 "The Hill and the Hole"
 "The Dreams of Albert Moreland"
 "The Hound / Diary in the Snow"
 "The Man Who Never Grew Young"
 "The Sunken Land"
 "Adept's Gambit"

Sources 

1947 short story collections
Nehwon books
Short story collections by Fritz Leiber
Fantasy short story collections
Horror short story collections
Arkham House books